Gopikrishnan Kottoor is the pen name of Raghav G. Nair (born 1956, Thiruvananthapuram, Kerala), an Indian English poet. He is best known for his poem "Father, Wake Us In Passing". He is also the founder editor of quarterly poetry journal Poetry Chain. Kottoor lives in Trivandrum, Kerala.

Early life and education
Kottoor studied at the Loyola English School and Arya Central School, Trivandrum. He obtained his Bachelor's and Master's degrees in English from the Institute of English, Trivandrum. Kottoor won his first poetry prize in University college poetry competitions, and soon published his poetry in Indian magazines publishing poetry in English. He attended the Master of Fine Arts (Poetry) program of the Texas State University, Southwest Texas, US. In 2005, he was Poet-in-Residence at the University of Augsburg, Germany, on a sponsorship by the Indian Council of Cultural Relations (ICCR) in association with Tagore Centre, Berlin. On 4 August 2019, he was requested to join the Indian Writers Association as a member of its advisory board.

Career

As poet

Gopi Kottoor won both the All-India Special Poetry Prize of the British Council-Poetry Society, India All India Poetry Competitions (AIPC) in 1997 for his poem "These are the things we could talk about" and Second Prize for his poem "Digging" in the General Category of the Competition in 1997. Between 1995 and 1998, he won two more poetry prizes presented by the British Council – Poetry Society (India) sponsored All India Poetry Competitions (AIPC).

His other major poetry prizes include The All India Poetry Competition(2017) and Wingword International Poetry Award(2021).

Kottoor's "Father, Wake Us In Passing" (2000), which won for the poet a Residency in the University of Augsburg, Germany, is a touching poem sequence on his father in coma, and dying. It has received rave reviews. Kottoor's poetry has appeared in international journals that include  Orbis (UK) , Ariel (University of Calgary), Toronto Review (Canada), Plaza (Japan), Arabesques Review (Africa), Persona (Texas State University Journal),  Bluefifth Online (UK),  Chiaroscuro Magazine (UK), Levure littéraire (UK), Big bridge (UK) , Nth Position (UK),  New English Review (UK)  and others. His poems are also featured in the anthology, The Dance of the Peacock.

A selection of Gopi Kottoor's poetry, 'Vrindavan' and Changampuzha's elegy 'Ramanan' in translation can be read online here

As playwright

Kottoor's play The Nectar of the Gods (2015) is a socio-historical take on the life of the palace soldier Devasahayam (Lazarus), who was executed following his conversion to Christianity during the reign of King Marthanda Varma (Kerala, 18c). His other plays include The Mask of Death, a radio-play on the dying days of the Romantic poet John Keats in Rome, Fire in the Soul, a play on the life and times of the Nationalist rebel poet of India, Subramania Bharati, and A Woman in Flames.

As novelist

Kottoor's first novel, A Bridge Over Karma, was translated into Malayalam and serialized in the popular Malayalam journal Kala Kaumudi.

As editor

Kottoor founded and edited Poetry Chain, a quarterly for Indian poetry in English, which ran from 1997–2007. He also edits the E-zine Underground Flowers.

Awards

 All India Poetry Competition (First Prize), The Poetry Society India, 2017.
 All India Special Poetry Prize, Poetry Society, India and The British Council, 1997.
 All India Poetry Prize (Second Prize), Poetry Society, India and The British Council, 1997.
 All India Poetry Awards, Commendation prizes, 1995 & 1998.
 The Bharathi Prize, Chennai (1995)
 The Kerala University College Prize (1976)
 The Clover Poetry Prize, Commendation (1973)

Honours
 Philip McCormick Scholarship, Texas State University, Texas, US 2000
 Distinguished Guest from India, Government of India Annual Report 2005-2006,(p) 152
 Michael Madhusudan Dutt Award
 D.Litt, World Academy of Arts, California, US
 21 Top Indian Poets

Bibliography

Poetry
 Piccolo 
 Milestones to the Sun
 Sunbirds in the Rain
 Nirvana and Other poems
 Rev: Father Benedict Goes To Heaven and Other poems
 Father, Wake Us In Passing,(Vater, Wecke Uns Im Vorübergehen – German, Laufschrift 2004)
 Mother Sonata
 A Buchenwald Diary (Poems following a visit to Buchenwald Concentration camp, Weimar, Germany)
 Victoria Terminus, Poems Selected and New
 Vrindavan – The Coloured Yolk of Love
 Tell Me Neruda

Novels
 A Bridge Over Karma (Katha Distribution, New Delhi)  Karmathinu Mele Oru Palam (Translation, Malayalam, Moosakutty).
 Presumed Guilty
 Hill House (A View From West Hill)

Plays
 The Nectar of Gods – King Marthanda Varma and Devasahayam
 Fire in the Soul – The Life And Times of Subramania Bharati
 The Mask of Death – The Final Days of John Keats
 A Women in Flames

Transcreations
 Jnanappana (Poonthanam) as Fountain of God
 Rati Rahasya (Kukoka) as Love's Ecstasies

Philosophy
 The Twelve Petals of Enlightenment (Param Hans)

Children's
 Wander From The Great Wide Wander Galaxy (Fantasy)

Editor
 Poetry Anthology (Editor) "A New Book of Indian Poems in English"(Poetry Chain and Writers Workshop Calcutta)
 Poetry Chain – A Poetry Quarterly since 1997

 Kottoor's reviews on Indian English Poetry
 A Rebel and an Observer :Review
 Signature of Sensuality :Review
 On A Poetic Cruise :Review
 Bhakti Blazes The Vernacular :Review
 For verse or for worse :Review
 Goodness of Nature And God :Review
 Magic And Mystery of Love :Review
 Idioms And Images :Review
 Not Much Happening :Review
 Dear Dad :Review
 Solitary romantic :Review
 A ThanksGiving For Life :Review
 Representative Voices :Review
 Tales of Change :Review
 A Fine Flow of Emotion :Review
 Self-Indulgent Words :Review
 Rewarding Read :Review
 Transience of Human Love :Review
 Frank Images 

 Appearances in the following poetry Anthologies
   Verse, Seattle(USA) : Special edition on Contemporary Indian Poetry in English 
 The Bloodaxe Book of Contemporary Indian Poets (2008) ed. by Jeet Thayil and published by Bloodaxe Books Ltd., United Kingdom
 Give the Sea Change USA (Fulcrum, Ed. Jeet Thayil ) 
 The Golden Jubilee Anthology of Indian Poets in English NBT, India (Ed.Eunice de Souza ) 
 99 Poets (Ed. Manu Dash) 
 The Dance of the Peacock: An Anthology of English Poetry from India (2013) ed. by Vivekanand Jha and published by Hidden Brook Press, Canada
 Travelogue : The Grand Indian Express (2018) ed. by Dr. Ananad Kumar and published by Authorspress, New Delhi

Literature Arts and Culture
Tribute From France:Review
Keats Home Hampstead England:Review

References

Sources
 Father, Wake us in Passing: A Book of poems (A Poetry Chain Imprint)Review: Touching Recollections
 Father Wake Us in Passing: Review: Beyond The Confessional
 Father Wake Us in Passing(Guest Poet Readings at University of Augsburg Germany): Comment
 The Coloured Yolk of Love: Poetry Online 
 Varnamala – A Web Anthology of Indian English Poetry Anthology 
 Bluefifth Review Winter 2003 PoetryOnline 
 NthPosition Online Magazine PoetryOnline 
 The Poetry of Emotion, Colour and Passion Literary Interview  
 Transcreating Poonthanam Review
 Meditations on Life Review
 E-books India 

 The Enchanting Verses 
 Bigbridge Anthology PartII  
 Life and Legends 

1956 births
Living people
Indian male poets
Writers from Thiruvananthapuram
English-language poets from India
Indian male novelists
Indian children's writers